Shiravali is a small village in Ratnagiri district, Maharashtra state in Western India. The 2011 Census of India recorded a total of 867 residents in the village.

The village is the birth place of the 19th-century Hindu revivalist Vishnubawa Brahmachari.

References

Villages in Ratnagiri district